The list of ship launches in 1737 includes a chronological list of some ships launched in 1737.


References

1737
Ship launches